The Nicosia Britannia disaster was the death of 126 passengers and crew on a Bristol Britannia of the Swiss airline Globe Air when it flew into the ground  south of Nicosia Airport, in Cyprus.

Accident
The Britannia was operating a charter flight bringing tourists from Bangkok in Thailand to Basel in Switzerland with stopovers in Colombo, Bombay, and Cairo. The flight stopped at Colombo in Sri Lanka and then Bombay in India with the next stop due to be Cairo. The crew diverted the flight to Nicosia due to bad weather at Cairo. The aircraft was on the third attempt to land on Runway 32 in a violent thunderstorm when it flew into a hill near the village of Lakatamia and burst into flames.

At the time of the crash, both pilots had exceeded their authorized duty time by three hours. The flight's first officer had less than 50 hours flying time in Britannia aircraft.

Two German (Christa Blümel and Peter Femfert) and two Swiss (Veronika Gysin and Nicolas Pulver) passengers survived; three of them were seriously injured and were treated at a United Nations field hospital near Nicosia, the fourth, Nicolas Pulver, was reported to be unhurt.

Legacy 
The crash culminated in Globe Air's bankruptcy and the sale of paintings that led to the 1967 Basel Picasso paintings purchase referendum.

References 

Aviation accidents and incidents in 1967
Aviation accidents and incidents in Cyprus
Accidents and incidents involving the Bristol Britannia
Airliner accidents and incidents involving controlled flight into terrain
Airliner accidents and incidents caused by weather
1967 in Cyprus
April 1967 events in Europe
1967 disasters in Cyprus